Hoseynabad (also Romanized as Ḩoseynābād) is a village in Zaveh Rural District, in the Central District of Zaveh County, Razavi Khorasan Province, Iran. At the 2006 census, its population was 85, in 19 families.

References 

Populated places in Zaveh County